Kazimierz Wyka (19 March 1910 – 19 January 1975) was a Polish literary historian, literary critic, and professor at the Jagiellonian University in Kraków following World War II. He was a deputy to the Polish parliament (Sejm) from 1952 to 1956 during the era of Stalinism in Poland.

Life
Wyka was a son of a small sawmill owner, born and raised in Krzeszowice. He studied at the Jagiellonian University and during the occupation of Poland by Nazi Germany remained safely with the family in his small town. He became active politically only after the Soviet takeover, and obtained a position of a professor at his Alma mater in 1948. In 1952 Wyka co-founded and run the Polish–Soviet Friendship Society (Towarzystwo Przyjaźni Polsko-Radzieckiej), a cover for the direct Soviet propaganda in Poland, which enabled him to also remain Member of Parliament in 1952–56 before the collapse of Stalinism during the Polish October. Notably Wyka signed the so-called "Letter of 34" (List 34) against censorship, delivered in March 1964 to Council of Ministers (Poland) and than passed on to The Times. However, the resulting uproar in the communist party circles prompted Wyka to sign a counter letter against it, claiming that the Radio Free Europe spreads false information about the Soviet repressions in Poland, which in its own right was an obscene lie, wrote Norman Davies. Wyka was one of only two men who strategically withdrew their names from the original list to save their own jobs at the last moment.

In 1980, the president (mayor) of Kraków established the commemorative Kazimierz Wyka Award in the field of literary criticism, essay, and history of literature.  The award was given annually.

References

External links
 Family home of K. Wyka in Krzeszowice

1910 births
1975 deaths
20th-century Polish historians
Polish male non-fiction writers
Polish literary critics
Members of the Polish Sejm 1952–1956
Academic staff of Jagiellonian University
Burials at Salwator Cemetery
Recipients of the State Award Badge (Poland)